Pa Paandi (also known by its former title Power Paandi) is a 2017 Indian Tamil-language comedy drama film, written and directed by Dhanush in his directorial debut. He also produced the movie under his studio Wunderbar Films. The film revolves around Pa Paandi (played by Rajkiran in the titular role), a retired ex-stunt master in the film industry, travels to Hyderabad to seek out for freedom, and also to reunite with his old village lover. Revathi, Prasanna and Chaya Singh play supporting roles in the film. Dhanush, who produced and directed the film, portray a cameo appearance in the film as the younger version of the protagonist, while Madonna Sebastian, Gautham Vasudev Menon and Dhivyadarshini too played cameo roles.

The film was announced on 5 September 2016, announcing  the title of the film, with a poster release,  and the commencement of Principal photography took place on the same day. The filming took place in Chennai, Hyderabad and Madurai. Initially the film was titled Power Paandi, the makers changed its title to Pa Paandi to seek tax exemption for the film. The music was composed by Sean Roldan, while Velraj and Prasanna G. K. handled the film's cinematography and editing respectively.

Pa Paandi was released on 14 April 2017, coinciding  with the Tamil New Year's Day, receiving positive reviews from critics and became a commercial success. This movie was remade in Kannada as Ambi Ning Vayassaytho was released in 2018.

Plot
Power Paandi, an ex-stuntmaster in the Tamil cinema industry, is now leading a retired life with his son Raghavan and family. Paandi is very close to his grandchildren Dhruv and Shaksha. He could not sit idle at home and gets involved in other issues outside his house, which brings trouble to Raghavan. He also tries to keep him occupied by going for some part-time jobs like a gym instructor, sidekick, and cinema stuntman, but nothing fulfills him. This brings friction between Paandi and Raghavan.

Paandi, seeking his freedom, goes out of his house with his old bullet and final day savings. On his way, he sees a bunch of old people riding their bikes like him, and narrates his first love experience with them. He shares about how he, in his young age, met Poonthendral for the first time, how they fell in love, and how they were separated. He tells them that he is on a journey to find Poonthendral again. An old man in that group helps Paandi locate Poonthendral. Paandi messages Poonthendral, who has now settled in Hyderabad, as he was in her place and was eager to meet her again.

Finally, Poonthendral agrees to meet him in a restaurant, and both of them meet, remembering all the by-gone days. They post their meet on social media and express happiness for each other's life. Paandi proposes to Poonthendral to live the rest of their life together. Poonthendral, who was initially reluctant at his decision, later convinces herself about his companionship and asks him to come to her house the next day for a lunch and to meet her family (her daughter and granddaughter).

Back at Chennai, Raghavan realizes his mistake and start searching for his father everywhere. Dhruv locates Paandi using social media and finally comes to Poonthendral's house at Hyderabad to take Paandi back with them. When Paandi comes to Poonthendral's house for lunch, he gets reunited with Raghavan's family. Poonthendral and Paandi realize that their life has to go this way and decide to be in touch with each other for the rest of their lives. With much emotional bursts, Paandi leaves Poonthendral's house with Raghavan, waving his hands in air without seeing her, to which she responds.

Cast

 Rajkiran as Pandian Pazhanisami (Power Paandi)
Dhanush as younger Paandi
 Revathi as Poonthendral
Madonna Sebastian as younger Poonthendral
 Prasanna as Raghavan "Rambo"
 Master Raghavan as Dhruv
 Baby Chaavi Sharma as Shaksha
 Chaya Singh as Premalatha
 Vidyullekha Raman as Poongodi
 Bhawana Aneja as Power Paandi's wife
 Aadukalam Naren as Chandrasekhar, Poonthendral's father
 Meena Vemuri as Mrs. Chandrasekhar, Poonthendral's mother
 Bharathi Kannan as Poongodi's father
 Dheena as Mani, Paandi's friend
 Sentrayan as Drug Seller
 Rinson Simon as Varun
 Supergood Subramani as a police officer
 Robo Shankar as hero in Gautham's film
 Dhivyadharshini as Poonthendral's daughter
 Stunt Silva as Bullet Raja
 Baba Bhaskar as a villager
 Balaji Mohan as Raghavan, Paandi's neighbour
 Velraj as Police Inspector 
  Som Shekar as Letter Boy in song "Vaanam"

Guest appearances:
 Gautham Vasudev Menon as Director Gautham

Production

Development 
On 7 September 2016, Dhanush announced his directorial debut titled Power Paandi, with a first look poster being released to the media, and also producing the film under his production house,  Wunderbar Films. The film has Rajkiran playing the title role as "Power Paandi" and Prasanna playing a prominent role, as Rajkiran's son, while Sean Roldan, Velraj and Prasanna G. K. became a part of the film's technical crew as its music director, cinematographer and editor respectively. Actresses Revathi and Chaya Singh agreed to work on the film. Dhanush too played a cameo role in this film as the younger version of the protagonist, while Madonna Sebastian plays Dhanush's love interest. Gautham Vasudev Menon, Robo Shankar, Dhivyadharshini too play cameo appearances, along with Stunt Silva and Baba Bhaskar who also choreographed the action scenes and dance sequences.

Filming 
The film began production on the day of its public announcement. In April 2017, the title was changed from Power Paandi to Pa Paandi  to seek tax exemption.

Soundtrack

The music and score of the film were composed by Sean Roldan. The soundtrack album features six tracks written by Dhanush and directors Selvaraghavan and Raju Murugan. In an official press meet for the film, Dhanush stated Sean Roldan as the soul of Power Paandi, further adding that "It was so surprising to see that both our thoughts and creative expressions were same, which helped us bring out some good music with this film." Most of the songs were melodious and nostalgic themes. Dhanush wrote and sang a number "Soorakaththu" for the film. The song "Venpani Malare" written by Dhanush, features both male and female versions sung by Sean Roldan and Shweta Mohan, and an additional version sung by Dhanush was released later. The tracklist was released on 7 March 2017, on the production company's official Twitter account, and the complete album was released in on 9 March 2017. An additional version of "Venpani Malare" which was sung by Dhanush was included as a part of the soundtrack album on 27 March 2017. The male version of the song "Venpani Malare" was only featured in the film itself.
Upon its release, the album received predominantly positive reviews from critics, and also from celebrities. Behindwoods.com rated the soundtrack album 3.25 out of 5, and gave a verdict "A musically brilliant album with fervently composed tracks." Moviecrow rated the soundtrack album 3.25/5 and summarised it as "Sean Roldan produces another winner soundtrack with Power Paandi and Dhanush's penchant for Ilyaraja'esque music is apparent throughout the soundtrack." MusicAloud rated the album 3.5 out of 5 and stated that "Composer Sean Roldan's most mainstream movie project to date has a decidedly derivative sound, but is also very effective. Solid start for the Dhanush-Sean Roldan team. Hope this also means more soundtracks per year from the composer." BollywoodLife rated the album 3.5/5 and finalised it that "Sean Roldan has created a promising album for Dhanush's directorial debut. On hearing each song, you realise, there is a uniform theme being followed (subtle drum beats), despite that he has managed to make each song stand out. There is a jazzy feel to his compositions that makes it unique yet relatable. You must give this album a try because, when somebody creates songs that stir emotions it should not be missed." Sify rated the album 3 out of 5, with a verdict "Sean Roldan's big ticket to the top league." Hindustan Times rated the album 4 out of 5. Indiaglitz rated the album 2.75 out of 5. Top10 Cinema reviewed it as "One of the beautiful albums in recent times…"

Reception
CurrentlyGlobally.com gave the movie 3 stars and mentioned "Just watch this perfect positive summer movie with family - for the great thought, Raj Kiran, and Revathi, in the same order". The satellite rights of the film were bagged by STAR Vijay.

The film was remade in Kannada as Ambi Ning Vayassaytho starring Ambareesh in the titular role and produced by actor Sudeep. Baradwaj Rangan of Film Companion wrote "But here's why Pa Paandi works. Rajkiran. He exudes such grandfatherly warmth, it's impossible not to care for him. And as the second half unfolds, the story picks up too."

References

External links

2017 films
2010s Tamil-language films
Films shot in Hyderabad, India
Films scored by Sean Roldan
2017 comedy-drama films
Indian comedy-drama films
Tamil films remade in other languages
2017 directorial debut films
2017 comedy films